Erbin was a 5th-century king of Alt Clut, the extent of which has similarities to modern day Strathclyde, who reigned from c.480-485.

References

See also 
 List of Monarchs of Strathclyde
 List of Scottish Monarchs
 List of Pictish Monarchs
 List of Legendary Pictish Monarchs
 List of British Monarchs

5th-century Scottish monarchs